The Port of Ensenada is a marine freight and cruise terminal in Ensenada, Baja California. This deepwater port lies in Bahia de Todos Santos.

Ships arrive from major ports in Asia, North America, and South America. The port accommodates cruise ships, bulk cargo, and container ships. The Port of Ensenada maintains specialized shipyards. It also supports commercial and sport fishing, pleasure craft, and marina areas.

In 2010, the Port of Ensenada handled  of cargo and 156 cruise ship calls—the latter figure down from a peak of 293 three years earlier. In 2011, it was Mexico's second-busiest port and the second-most-visited port-of-call for major cruise lines and pleasure boats.

Maritime
The port authority administers two cargo terminals, which manage maritime connections with 64 ports in 28 countries. Exports are sent directly to ports in Hong Kong, Korea, Japan, Malaysia, Taiwan, Indonesia, Costa Rica, Honduras, Chile, France, Italy, Spain, Morocco and Algeria. As of 2011, imports predominantly came from Nicaragua, New Zealand, and Asian countries.

Cruise
The port's main cruise ship facility is in the center of the port at the Cruise Terminal and Marina designated area. The port authority devised plans in 2009 to dredge parts of the port to serve post-Panamax vessels and reduce congestion at the Port of Long Beach.

Bulk cargo port
The bulk cargo port handles bulk commodities not transported in container ships.

Marina
The port maintains one marina and in 2011, was looking to expand a second marina then further develop both marinas. The port also maintains a sport fishing terminal.

Real estate

Shipyards
There are currently two shipyards that lie on the northern end of the port.

Hotels & resorts
The ports location at the approximate center of Todos Santos Bay provides expansive views that companies have taken the opportunity to capitalize on by developing resorts and hotels such as the Villa Marina. Hotels and resorts are located at the base of the Ensenada marina and along the coastal strip of the harbor.

Gallery

References

External links
 Port Arrivals to the Port of Ensenada

Transport in Ensenada Municipality
Ports and harbors of Baja California
Buildings and structures in Baja California